Prem Nath Pillai, known as M.S. Prem Nath, is a Malaysian film director and Editor of Indian descent based in Kuala Lumpur. He is well known for directing first Tamil language Zombie movie, Vere Vazhi Ille. 

Before becoming a director, prem worked as editor for KRU Studios from year 2002 to 2004. Currently, he manages his own production and post-production house, Merp Film Factory Sdn. Bhd.

Filmography

References

External links 
 

Year of birth missing (living people)
Living people
Malaysian film directors
Malaysian people of Indian descent
Malaysian people of Tamil descent